Euchromius scobiolae is a moth in the family Crambidae. It was described by Stanisław Błeszyński in 1965. It is found in Afghanistan (Kuschk), Turkmenistan (Buchara) and Tajikistan.

References

Crambinae
Moths described in 1965
Moths of Asia